Mount Olive is an unincorporated community in Mitcheltree Township, Martin County, in the U.S. state of Indiana.

History
A post office was established at Mount Olive in 1887, and remained in operation until it was discontinued in 1916. The community was likely named, directly or indirectly, after the Mount of Olives.

Geography

References

Unincorporated communities in Martin County, Indiana
Unincorporated communities in Indiana